Blake Kessel (born April 13, 1989) is an American retired professional ice hockey defenseman who most recently was coaching Ironbound Elite 16U Premier in the USA Hockey Women's 16U AA. He most recently played for the Orlando Solar Bears in the ECHL. He was selected by the New York Islanders in the 6th round (166th overall) of the 2007 NHL Entry Draft.

Early life
Kessel was born to Phil and Kathy Kessel in Madison, Wisconsin. He attended the University of New Hampshire and majored in sports studies. Blake comes from a long line of professional athletes. His brother, Phil Kessel, plays for the Vegas Golden Knights of the National Hockey League (NHL), his sister Amanda Kessel plays for the United States women's national ice hockey team, and his father played football for the Washington Redskins of the National Football League and the Calgary Stampeders of the Canadian Football League. As well, his cousin, David Moss, previously played in the NHL for the Arizona Coyotes and the Calgary Flames.

Playing career
Kessel has been described as an offensive minded defenseman, who likes to join the offensive rush, which has been attributed to his speed and skill.

In Kessel's first season with the Waterloo Black Hawks, he played in 59 games, scoring 11 goals and accumulating 27 assists, for a total of 38 points. In his last season with the Black Hawks, Kessel led all defensemen in scoring with 57 points, scoring 19 goals and notching 38 assists in 59 games. Continuing the season to the playoffs, Kessel played in 11 games, adding 10 assists and 1 goal, for a total of 11 points.

Kessel signed an entry level contract with the Philadelphia Flyers on September 14, 2011. After spending two seasons playing for the team's minor league affiliates, the Adirondack Phantoms of the AHL and the Trenton Titans of the ECHL, the Flyers did not give Kessel a qualifying offer making him an unrestricted free agent.

On October 22, 2013, Kessel signed with the Bakersfield Condors.

On September 28, 2014, the Toronto Marlies announced that they had signed Kessel to an AHL contract. He was assigned to the Orlando Solar Bears, the Leafs' ECHL affiliate, on October 12, 2014. Kessel then landed a job in Finland and finished the 2014–15 season with Tampereen Ilves. He remained on the Ilves team until February 2016 and then took up an offer from German top-tier club Augsburger Panther, signing a contract until the end of the 2015–16 season.

In the following off-season, Kessel returned to North America to continue in the ECHL, signing a one-year deal with the Atlanta Gladiators on September 27, 2016. Tallying seven goals and 16 assists in 22 games for the Atlanta team, he was the league's top-scoring defenseman, when he was traded to the Kalamazoo Wings on November 28, 2016. On December 3, 2016 Kessel was signed to a professional tryout contract by the Milwaukee Admirals of the AHL. He appeared in 8 games with the Admirals before he was returned to the Wings.

In 2017, Kessel signed with HC Košice of the Tipsort liga in Slovakia. After playing with the HC Košice for a season, Kessel joined the ECHL's Jacksonville Icemen for their 2018–19 training camp. On February 17, 2019 Kessel was  traded from Jacksonville to the Maine Mariners.

International play  

Kessel landed a spot on the US roster for the 2009 U20 World Championships. In November 2015, he played for Team USA at the Deutschland-Cup in Augsburg.

Career statistics

Regular season and playoffs

International

Awards and honors

References

External links

1989 births
Living people
Adirondack Phantoms players
American men's ice hockey defensemen
Atlanta Gladiators players
Augsburger Panther players
Bakersfield Condors (1998–2015) players
Ice hockey players from Wisconsin
Ilves players
Jacksonville Icemen players
Kalamazoo Wings (ECHL) players
Maine Mariners (ECHL) players
Milwaukee Admirals players
New Hampshire Wildcats men's ice hockey players
New York Islanders draft picks
Orlando Solar Bears (ECHL) players
Rochester Americans players
Rockford IceHogs (AHL) players
Sportspeople from Madison, Wisconsin
Toronto Marlies players
Trenton Titans players
Waterloo Black Hawks players
People from Verona, Wisconsin
AHCA Division I men's ice hockey All-Americans